World DJ Festival (WDF) is a music festival initiated as the main program of Hi-Seoul Festival in 2007 at the Nanji Campground on the Han River in Seoul, South Korea.The annual World DJ Festival has been the biggest DJ Festival in Korea.

2007
The first festival appeared on May 3–5, 2007, and was a part of the Hi Seoul Festival, a seasonal events program coordinated by the city tourism agency.  Due to the positive feedback from the event, especially from young foreign expatriate residents in the dj scene, Idea Masters, an events promoter returned the following year with a much larger, paid admission event located at the current site.

The event was recognized as becoming one of the largest festivals in Korea, as it has attracted more than 90,000 people over three days in 2007. It featured a live concert, a dance party, and a world rhythm festival.

2008

The DJ festival showcased numerous DJs from around the world, and in a break from other festivals or events in the Seoul area, encouraged people to dance all night and into the morning. Artists, performers and fans of all tastes and genres including electronica, rock & roll, international, attended and showed their enthusiasm.

Unlike the first event in 2007, the following year became independently operated and required paid admission. As far as international flavor in Seoul, the DJ festival is noticeably more mixed as a combination of locals, visiting foreigners, expatriates, pros and amateurs, and guest DJs from overseas.

This festival lasted from May 3–5, 2008. In 2008, the SWDF returned to establish itself as the only DJ festival in Korea.

2009
The 2009 SWDF started on May 9.

Foreign DJs
Tech'1 (Singapore), Cornelius (JPN), DJ Dan (USA), Donald Glaude (USA), Ricky Stone (UK), Rabbit in the Moon (USA), Adam F (UK), Raphael Sebbag (FRA), Kawasaki (JPN), Superheadz (JPN), Kai (USA), Scott Pullen (AUS), C-Deuce&Loco, Brainshocker (ITA)

Korean DJs
DJ KOO, JAEIN, DJ BEEJAY, Oriental Funk Stew, Guru, Fugi, Ditto, Kidb, Kuma, Ultradog, Triple house, Sung woo, Yoo

See also

List of music festivals in South Korea
List of electronic music festivals

References

External links 

Korea Times 2007
Korea Herald 2008
Naver News
Korea Times 2009
Korea Herald 2009
SWDF on Daum 
SWDF on Naver 
SWDF on Cyworld

Music festivals established in 2007
Electronic music festivals in South Korea
Annual events in South Korea
Festivals in Seoul
Music in Seoul
DJing